A Summer Night with Olivia Newton-John was the eighteenth concert tour by Australian singer Olivia Newton-John, in support of her sixth soundtrack A Few Best Men. The tour name drifts from her 1978 hit, "Summer Nights", from the musical film Grease. It is Newton-John largest tour since the Heartstrings World Tour, which runs from 2002 to 2005. It was her first tour in the United Kingdom in over 30 years.

It was followed by a concert tour of similar name, Summer Nights, which is mostly a residency show.

Background and development
The tour first leg began in February in Australia, where Newton-John did seven concerts (two added by popular demand). The West Australian Symphony Orchestra participated to the Perth concerts, Melbourne Pops Orchestra to the Melbourne concerts and the Sydney Symphony Orchestra to the Sydney concerts.

A new medley with some songs from A Few Best Men was added to the setlist. Newton-John also performed on a few dates of her Australian leg the Australian Bicentenary song, "It's Always Australia for Me", from the 1988 album, The Rumour.

Olivia also did an interview by David Campbell to Australian talk show Morning about the concerts and her long career. She and Campbell sang "You're the One That I Want" at a Sydney concert. In Asia, she received extensive exposure by local media and was interviewed to newspapers such as Jakarta Globe, Bangkok Post and The Philippine Star.

The tour North American leg began in August, with a concert at Northalsted Market Days. The medley from A Few Best Men was removed, but "Weightless" continued in the setlist. A new medley with three old ballads by Newton-John was added; it consists of "Suspended in Time" (from Xanadu soundtrack), "Boats Against the Current" (from Totally Hot album) and "Shaking You" (from Two of a Kind soundtrack). The two later were performed for the first time by Olivia. The 2013 setlists doesn't have any songs from A Few Best Men soundtrack, and the ballads medley was withdrawn (only "Suspended in Time" was performed at North American concerts). United Kingdom concerts had a new medley added recalling Newton-John's participation on Eurovision Song Contest 1974, consisted of "Long Live Love" (UK's entrant to that year contest), "Angel Eyes" (another choice to represent the UK) and a cover of "Waterloo" (1974 Eurovision winner by Swedish group ABBA).

Critical response
Ross McRae, from the newspaper The West Australian did a positive review to the first Perth concert, saying that Newton-John "led the enthusiastic crowd through a journey of her extensive 40-year career", but stated the medley of A Few Best Men "seemed misguided and unnecessary". Kittipong Thavevong from The Nation made a mixed review to the Bangkok show, writing: "Those who expected her to perform with the same voice quality as in her heyday left feeling disappointed. But those who simply wanted to a long-time favourite singer perform live were more than satisfied".

About her Singapure concert, Christopher Toh, from Today gave a rave review, wrote that "she hit notes that were seemingly impossible; notes that soared up into the stratosphere" and "was just perfect in almost every sense of the word". Nancy Koh from The Straits Times commented that "her moves were slick, her dancing sexy, and she even skipped like a delighted schoolgirl after receiving a few presents from the audience", but also criticized the medley of A Few Best Men. Nur Aqidah Azizi, from the Malaysian newspaper New Straits Times wrote: "Newton-John made her way to centre stage with her seven-piece band, it was evident that the crowd could not contain their excitement – the arena was ringing with rapturous cheer. [...] Her voice was still as sweet as how many would have remembered it. Heartfelt yet powerful, it was perfect in every way". Mike Bradstone from the Sri Lankan Sunday Observer commented that "Newton-John certainly has not lost the charisma and voice and could easily go on for many more years. I would sum up the evening up by saying 'Elegant, classy, graceful, entertaining and well-choreographed'." Lynda Mills from The Jakarta Post wrote: "With her still youthful looks, a voice that remains clear and pure, and an ability to shimmy and shake with the best of them, Olivia belies her 63 years."

Opening acts

Jon English (Perth)
Daryl Braithwaite (Melbourne)
Alfie Boe (Sydney)

Farhan Azizan (Genting Highlands)
Lanerolle Brothers (Colombo)
Blaze & Kelly (Eagle)

Setlist

Tour dates

Festivals and other miscellaneous performances
a This concert is a part of the Northalsted Market Days.
b This concert is a part of the Pacific National Exhibition.
c These concerts are a part of the Norsk Høstfest.

Cancellations and rescheduled shows

Personnel
Andy Timmons – musical director, guitar, backing vocals
Dan Wojciechowski – drums
Lee Hendricks – bass
Catherine Marx – keyboards
Warren Ham – saxophones, backing vocals
Steve Real – backing vocals
Carmella Ramsey – backing vocals

References

External links
 Tour dates at Newton-John's official website

2012 concert tours
2013 concert tours
Olivia Newton-John concert tours